Paul Rudolph (14 November 1858 – 8 March 1935) was a German physicist who designed the first anastigmatic lens while working for Carl Zeiss. After World War I, he joined the Hugo Meyer optical company, where he designed most of their cine lenses.

Work
 1890: First anastigmat lens "protar" 
 1895: Planar design
 1899: Unar design
 1902: Tessar design
 1918: Plasmat design
 1922: Kino-Plasmat design
 1926: Makro-Plasmat design
 1931: Kleinbild-Plasmat design

References

1858 births
1935 deaths
19th-century German inventors
19th-century German physicists
Optical physicists
Optical engineers
20th-century German inventors
20th-century German physicists